Abdul Rabeeh (born 23 January 2001) is an Indian professional footballer who plays as a forward for Indian Super League club Hyderabad.

Club career

Early life and youth career 
Born in Malappuram, Abdul started his youth career at MSP Higher Secondary School in 2013. He then moved to the under-16 team of Indian Super League club Bengaluru FC, where he represented the club in Elite Youth League. He then moved to the reserve side of Kerala Blasters FC in 2019, and featured for the club in the 2019–20 I-League 2nd Division season, and for the 2019–20 Kerala Premier League season, which they ended up as the champions.

Luca Soccer Club 
In 2020, Abdul signed for the Kerala Premier League side Luca Soccer Club, where he spent the 2020–21 season. He then left the club in June 2021 for Hyderabad FC.

Hyderabad FC 
On 22 June 2021, it was announced that Hyderabad FC has signed Abdul for the 2021–22 season. He was initially signed for their reserve squad, after being scouted by the club during his days at Luca SC. Abdul was included in the club's squad for the 2021 Durand Cup tournament, where he scored his debut goal in his debut game for the club on 12 September in their 5–0 win over Assam Rifles. Abdul, along with Mark Zothanpuia was then promoted to the senior team for 2021–22 Indian Super League season. He made his league debut on 23 December in the match against SC East Bengal as a substitute for Aniket Jadhav in the 83rd minute of the game, which ended in a 1–1 draw. He included in the playing 11 at first against Jamshedpur, which ended in a defeat in a 3–0 final score.

Career statistics

Club

Honours

Club

Kerala Blasters FC Reserves 

 Kerala Premier League: 2019–20

Hyderabad FC 

 Indian Super League: 2021–22

References

External links 
 
Abdul Rabeeh at Indian Super League
 Abdul Rabeeh at Hyderabad FC

2001 births
Living people
Association football midfielders
Indian footballers
Footballers from Kerala
I-League 2nd Division players
Kerala Blasters FC Reserves and Academy players
Indian Super League players
Hyderabad FC players